John Ogden Whedon (November 5, 1905 – November 22, 1991) was an American screenwriter. He is best known for his writing for the television series The Donna Reed Show during the 1950s. Whedon also wrote for The Great Gildersleeve on radio, The Andy Griffith Show, The Dick Van Dyke Show and Leave It to Beaver.

He and wife, Louise Carroll Angell, had two children: Tom (a television screenwriter) and Julia. John and Louise's grandsons were Joss, Jed and Zack Whedon.

Death
Whedon died in Medford, Oregon on November 22, 1991, aged 86. He is buried in East Cemetery, Litchfield County, Connecticut.

References

External links
 

1905 births
1991 deaths
American male screenwriters
The Harvard Lampoon alumni
Whedon family
20th-century American male writers
20th-century American screenwriters